Daw is a surname. It may refer to:

Darren Daw (born 1964) UK Construction Director 
 Anne Daw, South Australian campaigner for the protection of water resources and arable land from invasive mining activities
 Carl P. Daw Jr. (born 1944), American religious leader
 Chris Daw (born 1970), Canadian Paralympian in multiple sports
 Evelyn Daw (actress) (1912-1970), American actress and singer
 Jeff Daw (born 1972), Canadian hockey player
 John Daw (1870–1965), American Navajo military scout
 Kinkar Daw (born 1940), Indian cricketer
 Leila Daw (born 1940), American artist
 Majak Daw (born 1991), Australian footballer
 Marjorie Daw (actress), stage name of American silent film actress Margaret House (1902–1979)

Fictional characters
 the title character of "Marjorie Daw" (short story), by Thomas Bailey Aldrich

See also 
 Dawe (surname)
 Daw (given name)

English-language surnames